Lowry may refer to:

People
 Adam Lowry (born 1993), American ice hockey player
 Calvin Lowry (born 1983), American football player
 Dave Lowry (born 1965), Canadian ice hockey player
 Desiree Lowry (born 1972), Puerto Rican beauty pageant titleholder
 Hiram Harrison Lowry (1843–1924), American Methodist missionary to China
 Heath W. Lowry (born 1942), British historian of the Ottoman Empire
 Henry Berry Lowrie (born ,  1872), Confederate outlaw
 Henry Dawson Lowry (1869–1906), English journalist
 James Lowry Jr. (1820–1876), Scottish mayor of Pittsburgh, Pennsylvania
 James K. Lowry (born 1942) zoologist. Lowry is his zoological author abbreviation
 Joseph Wilson Lowry (1803–1879), British engraver
 Kyle Lowry (born 1986), American basketball player
 L. S. Lowry (1887–1976), British artist/painter
 Leonard Lowry (1884–1947), New Zealand politician
 Lois Lowry (born 1937), American author
 Malcolm Lowry (1909–1957), British author and poet
 Mark Lowry (born 1958), American comedian
 Martin Lowry (1874–1936), British physical chemist
 Michael Lowry (born 1953), Irish politician
 Mike Lowry (1939–2017), American politician
 Noah Lowry (born 1980), American baseball pitcher
 Oliver H. Lowry (1910–1996), American biochemist
 Ray Lowry (1944–2008), British cartoonist, illustrator and satirist
 Rich Lowry (born 1968), American editor and columnist
 Robert Lowry (disambiguation)
 Shane Lowry (footballer) (born 1989), Australian/Irish footballer
 Shane Lowry (golfer) (born 1987), Irish golfer
 Sumter de Leon Lowry Jr. (1893–1985), a Florida businessman who ran for governor
 Sylvanus Lowry (–1865), American politician
 Thomas Lowry (1843–1909), American businessman
 Tom Lowry (1898–1976), New Zealand cricketer
 Tommy Lowry (1945-2015), English footballer

Places

United States
 Lowry, Minnesota
 Lowry, South Dakota
 Lowry, Virginia
 Lowry Air Force Base, a former air force base in Colorado
 Lowry Avenue Bridge, Minneapolis, Minnesota
 Lowry City, Missouri
 Lowry Crossing, Texas
 Lowry Park Zoo, Tampa, Florida
 Lowry Run, a stream in Ohio

United Kingdom
 The Lowry, an art gallery in Salford, England
 The Lowry Academy, a secondary school in Salford, England
 Lowry Hotel in Salford, England

Other
 Lowry (band), Brooklyn-based indie rock band
 Lowry protein assay

See also
 Lavery
 Lourie
 Lowrey (disambiguation)
 Lowrie (disambiguation)

Patronymic surnames